The 2001 Ivy League Baseball Championship Series took place at Bill Clarke Field in Hanover, New Hampshire on May 5 and 6, 2001.  The series matched the regular season champions of each of the league's two divisions.  , the winner of the series, claimed their third title and the Ivy League's automatic berth in the 2001 NCAA Division I baseball tournament.  It was Princeton's sixth appearance in the Championship Series, all of which were consecutive.

Dartmouth made their second appearance in the Championship Series, also losing to Princeton in 2000.

Results

References

Ivy League Baseball Championship Series
Tournament
Ivy League Baseball Championship Series